Zhang Dejun may refer to:
Zhang Hejun, Chinese businessman 
Wang Ji'en (died 999), Chinese eunuch and a military general during the Zhou and Song dynasties